Luis Huete (born 1956, Spain) is a Spanish professor at IESE Business School, University of Navarra.

Biography 
He holds a degree in Law at the University of Navarra and an MBA from IESE Business School. Afterwards he earned his doctorate in Business Administration from Boston University. He was a Fulbright Scholar. His dissertation on strategy in commercial banking services was named the best dissertation of the year in the United States in 1988.

Publications 
He is the author of twelve management books and also a frequent contributor of articles to the business press.

References

External links 
 Luis Huete – own page

1956 births
Living people
Spanish economists
Academic staff of the University of Navarra
Boston University alumni